Command & Conquer: Remastered Collection is a remaster of the first two titles in the real-time strategy video game series Command & Conquer with rebuilt graphics and sound improvements, and bonus materials. It was developed by Petroglyph Games with Lemon Sky Studios, and published by Electronic Arts. It was released on June 5, 2020, for Origin and Steam. A physical edition intended for collectors was released by Limited Run Games.

The compilation includes remasters of the first two Command & Conquer games originally developed by Westwood Studios, Command & Conquer (1995) and Red Alert (1996), along with their expansion packs and content that had been exclusive to console ports. It features 4K graphics, remastered music, upscaled full motion video cinematic footage, enhanced sidebar UI, modern online features, and an unlockable gallery of unused and "making of" content.

The source code for the original Command & Conquer and Red Alert was released on June 2 (three days before game's release). This code, which was used to create the remastered games' back-end game engine, allows people to create game mods that can be played through the games' built-in mod loading system.

Gameplay

Command & Conquer: Remastered Collection is a collection of remasters of the first two Command & Conquer video games: Tiberian Dawn and Red Alert. It includes three expansion packs: The Covert Operations, Counterstrike, and The Aftermath as well as additional missions and briefing videos from the Nintendo 64 and PlayStation ports, totaling about 100 campaign missions. The sidebar UI was revamped to be easier to use, and other features were added.

Synopsis

Command & Conquer: Remastered Collection consists of two games: Command & Conquer: Remastered and Command & Conquer: Red Alert - Remastered. They contain the same plot as their original counterparts, with visual changes and upscaled full motion video cinematic footage.

Development 
During EA Play 2018 Electronic Arts presented Command & Conquer: Rivals, and subsequently received feedback that gamers would want another PC release in the Command & Conquer franchise. They contacted Petroglyph Games, which was founded by previous programmers of Westwood Studios (developers of the original Command & Conquer video game), who said they welcome the collaboration. The whole development process was marked by close collaboration between the studios responsible for developing the game and the community surrounding the franchise. At first, the team was not sure whether to create a remake or a remaster of the original game, but because of the popularity of remasters such as Age of Empires: Definitive Edition they decided to do a remaster. Petroglyph opted to use the original game engine from 1995 to keep the game as familiar as possible, with minor tweaks and bugfixes where needed. One such improvement was a port of Red Alerts artificial intelligence to the original game, because of similarities in the codebase. The graphics and animations were updated by Lemon Sky Studios in Malaysia. During the development Petroglyph Studios has frequently contacted the franchise community about feedback on art and direction of the production, to a point where they recruited some of the top figures in the community (including modders, competitive players, shoutcasters, etc.) in private Discord server for continuous feedback. The box art for the game was also previously made by a community member, and later commissioned by Petroglyph for the game. The multiplayer component of the game has been rebuilt from scratch. Achievements and level editor have also been added. The game launched on Steam and Origin on June 5, 2020.

Music

Command & Conquer: Remastered Collection contains the original music of the games, remasters of those tracks, and some music that was either cut or lost for the original titles, done by Frank Klepacki. In addition, Klepacki, along with the fan band The Tiberian Sons, remixed and performed 22 more tracks specifically for the remaster, based on their performance at MAGFest 2019, featuring tracks from the first two games, as well as a few tracks from later games (Renegade, Tiberian Sun, Red Alert 2, the expansion Yuri's Revenge, and Red Alert 3).

Reception

Command & Conquer Remastered Collection received "generally favorable reviews", according to review aggregator Metacritic.

References

Further reading 
 

2020 video games
Alternate history video games
Cold War video games
Cultural depictions of Albert Einstein
Cultural depictions of Adolf Hitler
Cultural depictions of Joseph Stalin
Electronic Arts video game compilations
Esports games
Multiplayer and single-player video games
Multiplayer online games
Real-time strategy video games
Video games with Steam Workshop support
Video game remasters
Video games about World War II alternate histories
Video games developed in the United States
Video games set in 1999
Video games set in 2001
Video games set in Albania
Video games set in Angola
Video games set in Austria
Video games set in Bosnia and Herzegovina
Video games set in Belarus
Video games set in Bulgaria
Video games set in Chad
Video games set in the Democratic Republic of the Congo
Video games set in Denmark
Video games set in Egypt
Video games set in Estonia
War video games set in Europe
Video games set in France
Video games set in Germany
Video games set in Greece
Video games set in Italy
Video games set in Hungary
Video games set in Latvia
Video games set in Liechtenstein
Video games set in Libya
Video games set in Mauritania
Video games set in Mexico
Video games set in Mozambique
Video games set in Namibia
Video games set in Nigeria
Video games set in Poland
Video games set in Romania
Video games set in Serbia
Video games set in Slovakia
Video games set in Slovenia
Video games set in South Africa
Video games set in Sudan
Video games set in Sweden
Video games set in Tanzania
Video games set in the Czech Republic
Video games set in Ukraine
Video games scored by Frank Klepacki
Video games about time travel
Windows games
Video game compilations
Petroglyph Games games
Command & Conquer